The Jack and Triumph Show is a television sitcom from Universal Television for Adult Swim that premiered on February 20, 2015, and ended on April 3, 2015, with a total of 7 episodes. The live-action series was created by Robert Smigel, Michael Koman, and David Feldman.

The series features Jack McBrayer playing Jack Mlicki, the former child star of a fictional Lassie-like series. The puppet Triumph the Insult Comic Dog represents his co-star from that series.

The series was initially picked up for 20 episodes, but when only 7 episodes had aired, in August 2015 Dino Stamatopoulos confirmed that it would not be returning.

Plot
The show is about two former child actors (Jack McBrayer and Triumph the Insult Comic Dog) who starred in a Lassie-like show from the 1980s and 1990s called Triumph's Boy. Jack had grown up playing the role of the small boy in the series even as he grew into adulthood. Though he is kind-hearted and optimistic, being a child actor had led to Jack being sheltered, naive, and socially awkward. After their show's cancellation, Jack and Triumph lived an indulgent and morally questionable lifestyle with the money they had made from the show. However, when Jack finds out that his parents had squandered all his earnings, he and Triumph are forced into a life of thievery and prostitution.

This goes on until Jack decides to visit June Gregory, who played the role of his mother in Triumph's Boy. She agrees to take in both him and Triumph on the condition that Jack does not go back into acting and instead tries to get back on the straight and narrow path of a normal, Christian lifestyle. She grows ever more disdainful of Triumph, who continues to be a trouble-making nuisance, and eventually comes up with a plan to get rid of him. June arranges for Jack to go on a wilderness trip. Right after he leaves, she tells Triumph to get in the car because Pet Smart is having a sale on used kitty litter. She gives Triumph a handheld game to occupy him on the ride and drives to Montana, where she throws him into a ditch and abandons him. She gets home seconds before Jack returns from his trip and tells him that Triumph had left to get cigars and never came back. Over the course of 15 years, June helps teach Jack how to live a normal life while Triumph follows her scent back to her house, picking up many jobs along the way to sustain himself. Jack greets him warmly, but June fakes feeling ill and tells Jack to go get her medication. While Jack is upstairs, June and Triumph yell angrily at each other until they come to an agreement: Triumph will not tell Jack what June did to him as long as Triumph can stay and live with the two of them.

Triumph is dead-set on getting Jack and himself back into show business and resuming their life of stardom. However, June insists that Jack continues living his reformed, Christian lifestyle. Triumph often goes to drastic measures finding ways to get publicity and gain back the pair's stardom while trying to keep June from finding out. The result is that Triumph and June are attempting to pull Jack in opposite directions, and he essentially has no power over his own life as the two manipulate him.

Cast
 Jack McBrayer as Jack Mlicki
 Robert Smigel as Triumph the Insult Comic Dog
 June Squibb as June Gregory
 Esther Ku as Tracy

Episodes

See also
 Madame's Place

References

External links
 

Adult Swim original programming
2010s American sitcoms
2015 American television series debuts
2015 American television series endings
English-language television shows
Television series by Universal Television
Television shows about dogs
Television duos
American television shows featuring puppetry